Edvard Lehmann (1815-1892) was a Danish painter, illustrator and lithographer who is mainly remembered for his work as a theatre painter. His drawings and watercolours are an importance source of knowledge about Danish theatre during the Danish Golden Age.

Biography
Lehmann was born in Copenhagen on 20 January 1815, the son of miniature painter Johan Peter Christian Lehmann and Johanne Lassen. He never married and left no children.

Lehmann studied at the Royal Danish Academy of Fine Arts from 1828. He worked at the Royal Danish Theatre as a costume draughtsman c. 1840-70, collaborating with August Bournonville.

Lehmann was also active as a portraitist and painted humorous genre paintings of street life in Copenhagen.

Exhibitions
Lehmann has been represented on the following exhibitions:

 Charlottenborg Spring Exhibition, Copenhagen ( 1829, 1931–34, 1836–58, 1867–69, 1876, 1878–81, 1885)
  Royal Academy of Fine Arts, Stockholm (1850)
 Nordic Art Exhibition, Copenhagen (1872)
 Rgeatre Exhibition, Copenhagen (1898)
 City Hall Exhibition, Copenhagen (1901)
 Danish Jewish Artists, Kunstforeningen, Copenhagen (1908)
 My Best Artwork, Statens Museum for Kunst, Copenhagen (1941)
 Kunstnerforen. af 18. Nov., Copenhagen (1942)
 ; Arte danese, Palazzo Braschi, Rome (1974)
 De ukendte guldaldermalere, Kunstforeninge, Copenhagen (1982)
 C.W. Eckersberg and His Students, Statens Museum for Kunst, Copenhagen (1983)
 Inden for murene, Kunstforeneningen, Copenhagen (1984)

Gallery

References

External links

 Edvard Lehmann at Kunstindeks Danmark
  Edvard Lehmann art artnet

19th-century Danish painters
Danish scenic designers
1815 births
1892 deaths